WVOT (1420 AM) was a radio station licensed to and located in Wilson, North Carolina, United States. The FCC assigned frequency was 1420 kHz. The station operated at 1,000 Watts non-directional by day, and 500 watts directional at night, largely on a north-facing axis.

Programming

The station's final format was urban contemporary gospel. Past formats have included talk, Carolina beach music, oldies, adult contemporary, contemporary hit radio, and block programming. The station's call letters originally stood for W-V(oice)-O(f)-T(obbacoland.)

History
WVOT signed on in June 1948.

Career Communications bought WVOT in 1990.

In 1997, Career Communications sold the station to Al Taylor's Taylor Group Broadcasting. During this time, the call letters were changed to WALQ.

On November 9, 2017, the Federal Communications Commission (FCC) informed WVOT that it had received a complaint on September 9 that the station had not operated since 2011 (broadcast stations are required to return to the air within a year of going silent), and ordered it to provide information about its operations since the expiration of its most recent special temporary authority authorization on August 29, 2014. The station did not respond to the operational status inquiry, and its license was cancelled on December 19, 2017.

WRDU-FM
In 1984, Century Communications sold WVOT & WXYY to Voyager Communications. The FM was moved to Raleigh and the call letters were changed to WRDU. A new tower site for WRDU (now WTKK) was built near Middlesex, North Carolina. The AM facility remained in Wilson.

References

External links
FCC Station Search Details: DWVOT (Facility ID: 8778)
 (covering 1947-1980)

VOT
Wilson, North Carolina
Defunct radio stations in the United States
Radio stations established in 1948
1948 establishments in North Carolina
Radio stations disestablished in 2017
2017 disestablishments in North Carolina
Defunct religious radio stations in the United States
VOT